No Question may refer to:

"No Question", song by Allure (band) and LL Cool J
"No Question", song by Prong from Cleansing (album)
"No Question", song by Joan as Police Woman To Survive 
"No Question", song by Dalek from Gutter Tactics